The men's triple jump event at the 1966 European Indoor Games was held on 27 March 1966 in Dortmund.

Medalists

Results

Qualification

Final

References

Triple jump at the European Athletics Indoor Championships
Triple